Edward Wade (November 22, 1802 – August 13, 1866) was an American lawyer and politician who served four terms as a U.S. Representative from Ohio from 1853 to 1861. He was the brother of Benjamin Franklin Wade.

Biography 
Born in West Springfield, Massachusetts, Wade received a limited schooling. He moved to Andover, Ohio, in 1821, where he studied law. He was admitted to the bar in 1827 and commenced practice in Jefferson, Ohio. He was served as Justice of the Peace of Ashtabula County in 1831. He moved to Unionville in 1832. He served as prosecuting attorney of Ashtabula County 1833. He moved to Cleveland in 1837.

Congress 
Wade was elected as a Free-Soil candidate to the Thirty-third Congress and reelected as a Republican to the Thirty-fourth, Thirty-fifth, and Thirty-sixth Congresses (March 4, 1853 – March 3, 1861). In January 1854, he was one of six signatories of the "Appeal of the Independent Democrats", drafted to oppose the Kansas-Nebraska Act.
He was not a candidate for renomination in 1860.

Death
He died in East Cleveland, Ohio, August 13, 1866, and was interred in Woodland Cemetery in Cleveland, Ohio.

References

Bibliography

1802 births
1866 deaths
People from West Springfield, Massachusetts
Ohio Free Soilers
Free Soil Party members of the United States House of Representatives from Ohio
Opposition Party members of the United States House of Representatives from Ohio
People from Jefferson, Ohio
Ohio lawyers
19th-century American politicians
Burials at Woodland Cemetery (Cleveland)
Republican Party members of the United States House of Representatives from Ohio